Akira Santillan was the defending champion but chose not to defend his title.

Evgeny Karlovskiy won the title after defeating Jason Jung 6–3, 6–2 in the final.

Seeds

Draw

Finals

Top half

Bottom half

References
Main Draw
Qualifying Draw

Nieslen Pro Tennis Championships - Singles
2018 Singles